Giovanni Furlani (4 September 1936 – 26 June 2019) was an Italian ice hockey player. He competed in the men's tournament at the 1956 Winter Olympics.

References

External links
 

1936 births
2019 deaths
Olympic ice hockey players of Italy
Ice hockey players at the 1956 Winter Olympics
Ice hockey people from Bolzano
Bolzano HC players